Greenleaf State Park is located near Braggs, Oklahoma, and is situated around the  Greenleaf Lake. Greenleaf Lake was built in 1939. There is an  hiking trail that begins inside the park and makes its way around Greenleaf lake and into the adjacent government land of Camp Gruber.

Greenleaf State Park is one of Oklahoma's original seven parks and one of its most scenic and family-oriented.  The park includes Lake Greenleaf as well as cabins, campgrounds, family recreation facilities and nature hiking trails.

Greenleaf Lake

Park Accommodations

Cabins
The lake cabins and other facilities at Greenleaf State Park were built in the 1930s by the CCC, WPA and German prisoners-of-war (POWs). The original buildings, constructed of native stone, remain a lasting and beautiful tribute to the skill of those who built them. Some even included a fireplace.

Added in 1994, Cabin 15, or "Cabin on the Lake" was designed to meet the challenges of campers with physical disabilities. Donated by Telephone Pioneers of America, a national organization of active and retired Southwestern Bell employees, the $90,000 campsite was, at that time, one of three handicap accessible cabins in the nation.

Campground
The park features recreational vehicle (RV) campgrounds, with a total of 158 campsites, classified as "Full Modern (21), Semi-modern (79) and Primitive tent sites. The principal differences are that 8 Modern sites have 50-amp electric service hookups and 13 Modern sites have 20-amp hookups. Semi-modern sites include 17 50-amp hookups and 62 30-amp hookups. The Primitive tent campsites have no electric or water hookups. All of these sites share use of a community building, pavilion, enclosed shelter, outdoor shelter, seasonal fast food grill, 18-hole miniature golf course and laundry center.  Guests will also enjoy the swimming pool, swim beach, heated fishing dock, amphitheater, nature center, playgrounds, hiking trails, horseshoes, volleyball courts and basketball courts.

Activities
The park naturalist offers astronomy programs, campfire programs, party barge tours of Greenleaf Lake and hay wagon rides, as well as arts and crafts, storytelling, nature hikes and more.  No jet skis or wave runners are allowed on Greenleaf Lake.  The kids' pond allows children 16 and under to fish at no charge with no permit required.  The park also offers activities such as wildlife viewing, holiday events and boating on Greenleaf Lake.

Fees
To help fund a backlog of deferred maintenance and park improvements, the state implemented an entrance fee for this park and 21 others effective June 15, 2020.  The fees, charged per vehicle, start at $10 per day for a single-day or $8 for residents with an Oklahoma license plate or Oklahoma tribal plate.  Fees are waived for honorably discharged veterans and Oklahoma residents age 62 & older and their spouses.  Passes good for three days or a week are also available; annual passes good at all 22 state parks charging fees are offered at a cost of $75 for out-of-state visitors or $60 for Oklahoma residents.  The 22 parks are:
 Arrowhead Area at Lake Eufaula State Park
 Beavers Bend State Park
 Boiling Springs State Park
 Cherokee Landing State Park
 Fort Cobb State Park
 Foss State Park
 Honey Creek Area at Grand Lake State Park
 Great Plains State Park
 Great Salt Plains State Park
 Greenleaf State Park
 Keystone State Park
 Lake Eufaula State Park
 Lake Murray State Park
 Lake Texoma State Park
 Lake Thunderbird State Park
 Lake Wister State Park
 Natural Falls State Park
 Osage Hills State Park
 Robbers Cave State Park
 Sequoyah State Park
 Tenkiller State Park
 Twin Bridges Area at Grand Lake State Park

See also
 Greenleaf State Park Resource Management Plan. Caneday, Lowell; Liu, Hung Ling (Stella); Wu, I-Chun (Nicky); Tapps,Tyler. Oklahoma State University. June 30, 2014. Accessed November 23, 2019.

References

Reservoirs in Oklahoma
Protected areas of Muskogee County, Oklahoma
State parks of Oklahoma
Nature centers in Oklahoma
Landforms of Muskogee County, Oklahoma